This is a timeline of women hazzans (also called cantors) in America.

 1884: Julie Rosewald, called “Cantor Soprano” by her congregation, became America's first female cantor, serving San Francisco's Temple Emanu-El from 1884 until 1893, although she was not ordained. She was born in Germany.
 1955: Betty Robbins, born in Greece, became the first female cantor to serve in the twentieth century (although she was not ordained) when she was hired at Temple Avodah in Oceanside, New York.
 1975: Barbara Ostfeld became the first female cantor to be ordained in Reform Judaism in 1975.
 1978: Mindy Jacobsen became the first blind woman to be ordained as a cantor.
 1978: Linda Rich became the first female cantor to sing in a Conservative synagogue (specifically Temple Beth Zion in Los Angeles) in 1978, although she was not ordained until 1996 when she finally received her ordination of "Hazzan Minister" from the "Jewish Theological Seminary" in New York.
 1987: Erica Lippitz and Marla Rosenfeld Barugel became the first female cantors in Conservative Judaism.
 1993: Leslie Friedlander became the first female cantor ordained by the Academy for Jewish Religion (New York).

 1999: Angela Warnick Buchdahl, born in South Korea, became the first Asian-American person to be ordained as a cantor. Buchdahl was later ordained as a Rabbi as well.

 2001: Deborah Davis became the first cantor of either sex (and therefore, since she was female, the first female cantor) in Humanistic Judaism; however, Humanistic Judaism has since stopped graduating cantors.
 2002: Sharon Hordes became the first cantor of either sex (and therefore, since she was female, the first female cantor) in Reconstructionist Judaism.
 2006: Susan Wehle became the first American female cantor in Jewish Renewal in 2006; she died in 2009.
 2009: Tannoz Bahremand Foruzanfar, who was born in Iran, became the first Persian woman to be ordained as a cantor in America.

References

Hazzans
Hazzans in the United States
Women hazzans
Jewish-American history
Women hazzans in the United States